Käkkälöjoki is a river in Finland. It rises near the Norwegian border and flows first southeast, then south and southwest/west until it enters the Ounasjoki River.

Rivers of Finland
Kemijoki basin